Elmore Manufacturing Company was a manufacturer of veteran and brass era automobiles and bicycles (1893–97), headquartered at 504 Amanda Street, Clyde, Ohio, from 1893 until 1912. The company took its name from  a small parcel of land in Clyde with the name Elmore associated with it where a stave mill was established originally, then evolved into bicycle production. Founded by Harmon Von Vechten Becker and his two sons, James and Burton, the Elmore used a two-stroke engine design, in straight twin or single-cylinder versions. They later produced a straight-3 followed by a straight-4 beginning in 1906 until production ended in 1912. The company advertising slogan was "The Car That Has No Valves", referring to the two-stroke engine.

History

 
The first car was offered in 1900 with two body styles seating either two or four passengers with a single cylinder engine producing 6 hp with a 62" wheelbase. The roadster was listed for US$750 ($ in  dollars ) By  1904 the Model 9 was the Elmore Convertible Runabout. Equipped with a tonneau, it could seat four passengers and sold for just US$850 ($ in  dollars ), making it one of the least-expensive vehicles on the market. The flat-mounted single-cylinder engine, situated at the center of the car, produced 6.5 hp (4.8 kW). A 2-speed transmission was fitted. The car weighed 1050 lb (476 kg).

The Elmore Runabout was next in line. It could seat two passengers and sold for US$800 ($ in  dollars ). The vertically mounted Straight-twin engine, also situated at the center of the car, produced 8 hp (6 kW). A 3-speed transmission was fitted. The angle iron-framed car weighed 1400 lb (635 kg).

The top model was the Elmore Tonneau. It could seat four passengers and sold for US$1400 ($ in  dollars ). The flat-mounted straight-twin was situated at the front of the car, produced 12 hp (8.9 kW). A 3-speed transmission was fitted. The angle iron-framed car weighed 1500 lb (680 kg).

General Motors
In 1908, Elmore's three-cylinder two-stroke caught the attention of William C. Durant, founder of General Motors. He purchased the company the following year for US$500,000 ($ in  dollars ), with Elmore becoming one of General Motors' divisions. After Durant was forced out of General Motors in 1910, the Elmore marque was soon cut, along with several other underperforming brands, to help General Motors achieve financial stability. The factory location was then bought from GM and the Clydesdale Motor Truck Company was in operation from 1917 to 1939. The Clydesdale Factory was then the site of Clyde Porcelain Steel Company until the factory burned down November 11, 1945. The factory was rebuilt and the Bendix Corporation operated a factory at this location which made front load washing machines under the Bendix Home Appliances until the business was sold to Avco Manufacturing Corporation in 1951, and combining Bendix Appliances with Crosley Appliances. In 1956, Avco sold Bendix Home Appliances to Philco. The current location is now Whirlpool Corporation where Maytag, Whirlpool, and Amana washing machines are manufactured and is the largest factory in America that manufactures washing machines.

See also
 Brass Era car
 List of defunct United States automobile manufacturers

Bibliography
 Frank Leslie's Popular Monthly (January, 1904)
 Clymer, Floyd. Treasury of Early American Automobiles, 1877-1925. New York: Bonanza Books, 1950.

References

Brass Era vehicles
Veteran vehicles
General Motors marques
Motor vehicle manufacturers based in Ohio
Defunct motor vehicle manufacturers of the United States
1890s cars
1900s cars
1910s cars
Defunct manufacturing companies based in Ohio
Ottawa County, Ohio
Sandusky County, Ohio
Vehicle manufacturing companies established in 1893
Vehicle manufacturing companies disestablished in 1912
1893 establishments in Ohio
1912 disestablishments in Ohio
Clyde, Ohio